The Seonbawi Museum of Art (선바위미술관) is an art museum in Gwacheon, South Korea.

See also
List of museums in South Korea

Art museums and galleries in South Korea
Buildings and structures in Gwacheon